The Walhalla is a hall of fame that honours laudable and distinguished people in German history – "politicians, sovereigns, scientists and artists of the German tongue"; Built decades before the foundation of the modern German state in 1871 and the formation of a modern German identity, "German" was initially understood as "Germanic", and included all ancient Germanic peoples (Gothic, Vandal, Lombardic, Anglo-Saxon) as well as medieval Dutch, Swedish, Russian, and modern Austrian and Swiss figures. The hall is a neo-classical building above the Danube River, in Donaustauf, east of Regensburg in Bavaria.

The Walhalla memorial is named for the Valhǫll of Norse Paganism. It was conceived in 1807 by Crown Prince Ludwig I of Bavaria in order to support the gathering momentum for the unification of the many German states into the German Empire. Following his accession to the throne of Bavaria, construction took place between 1830 and 1842 under the supervision of the architect Leo von Klenze. The memorial displays some 65 plaques and 130 busts covering 2,000 years of history, beginning with Arminius, victor at the Battle of the Teutoburg Forest in the year 9 CE.

History

By 1806 Napoleon's First French Empire had annexed German lands along the Rhine River and the North Sea. Central German states formed the Confederation of the Rhine, which sided with Napoleon. Francis II, Holy Roman Emperor, then formally dissolved the Holy Roman Empire of the German Nation (6 August 1806) and instead styled himself Emperor of Austria. The War of the Fourth Coalition (1806–1807) pitted German forces on both sides against each other, and Napoleon again prevailed.

In 1807, 20-year-old Crown Prince Ludwig of the Kingdom of Bavaria (newly elevated from Electorate to Kingdom by Napoleon in 1806), had the idea of reminding all Germans of their common heritage – of the great figures and events in ethnic German history. He commissioned several sculptors to create busts of famous individuals of his choice. Johann Gottfried Schadow's bust of Nicolaus Copernicus became one of the first completed, in 1807. Further suggestions for individuals to be honoured were solicited in 1808 from Swiss historian Johannes von Müller.

By the time of Crown Prince Ludwig's coronation as King Ludwig I of Bavaria in 1825, 60 busts had been completed. In 1826 Ludwig commissioned the construction of a memorial above the Danube River, near Regensburg, modelled after the Parthenon in Athens. The southern pediment frieze features the 1815 creation of the German Confederation; the northern pediment frieze features scenes from the Battle of the Teutoburg Forest of 9 AD. According to Pictorial Travels Continentally Described (circa 1892), the construction of the building cost £666,666.

A two thaler coin was minted commemorating the opening of the Walhalla, Krause catalog number KM# 811. It is moderately scarce.

At Walhalla's inauguration on October 18, 1842, there were 96 busts, plus 64 plaques for persons or events of which no portrait was available on which to model a sculpture. When the memorial was opened in 1842, Joseph Hartmann Stuntz authored a poem about Germany's greatness which was set to music by Joseph Hartmann Stuntz (two distinct men).

Since being "of the German tongue" (viz., Germanic tongue) was the main selection criterion for the original 160 persons representing the 1,800 years of German history, the King included individuals of the wider Germanic sphere,  including ancient Germanic notables as well as people from the Holy Roman Empire. Whereas the Valhalla of Norse mythology served as home to those gloriously slain in battle, Ludwig intended his Walhalla not only for warriors but also for scientists, writers, and clerics, and specifically included both men and women. Decades before the foundation of the modern German state in 1871 or the clear formation of a modern German identity, "German" was initially understood as "Germanic" and included all ancient Germanic peoples (Gothic, Vandal, Lombardic, Anglo-Saxon) as well as medieval Dutch, Swedish, Russian, and modern Austrian and Swiss figures.

Leo von Klenze's plans reveal the purpose of the subterranean level set within the foundation, the entrance to which is visible from the Danube River. The Central Aisle leads to the Hall of Expectations (Halle der Erwartungen), which was meant to house busts of individuals considered worthy of joining Walhalla, but who were still living at the time of their busts' creation. These busts would be ceremoniously carried into Walhalla following the deaths of the subjects. The Hall of Expectations was abandoned owing to changes in criteria for induction into Walhalla.

The first addition to the collection  was the bust of Martin Luther.
Ludwig, as a devout Catholic, had hesitated to include Luther. Several of the sculptors, including Ohnmacht and Schadow, had urged the king to include Luther, as did Johannes von Müller. Ludwig finally commissioned Luther's bust in 1831 from Ernst Friedrich Rietschel.
It was not included at the inauguration of Walhalla in 1842, but added in 1848 by Ludwig himself.
Luther's bust was placed just after the last of the original busts (Goethe's), disregarding the chronological arrangement by year of death.

Four further additions were made during Ludwig's lifetime: 
Archduke Charles, Duke of Teschen (died 1847, added 1853),
Josef Wenzel Graf Radetzky von Radetz  (died 1858, added in the same year),
Friedrich Schelling  (died 1854, added 1860)
and  Ludwig van Beethoven (added 1866).

In 1853, King Ludwig I established an additional Hall of Fame in Munich, specifically for Bavarians – the Ruhmeshalle. Nine of the Bavarian enshrinees have since become Walhalla enshrinees. Their busts in the Ruhmeshalle were destroyed in 1944, during a bombing raid, and have not been replaced. Instead, a plaque with their names tells of their transfer to Walhalla. King Ludwig I himself, who commissioned the Liberation
Hall and other monuments, was also enshrined both at Walhalla and in the Ruhmeshalle.

Helmuth von Moltke the Elder was the last addition of a military leader (in 1910). 
After World War I, new additions focussed on artists and intellectuals.
Beginning in 1933, when Kraft durch Freude and other National Socialist organizations promoted trips to Walhalla, visitor numbers increased exponentially. In 1937, when Hitler unveiled a Bruckner bust, 131,520 were counted.

The Walhalla memorial was reached by the Allied invasion of Germany in April 1945, by the US Third Army led by General George S. Patton.

Additions since 1945 are proposed by private individuals or private foundations, who will also pay for the production of the new bust. Suggestions are reviewed by the Bavarian Academy of Sciences, based on which a recommendation is made by the Bavarian Ministry of the Interior. The final decision lies with the Bavarian Council of Ministers. Official practice since 1945 has been to favour "eminent figures from science or art, or individuals with extraordinary social or caritative merit".

Nineteen busts have been added between 1945 and 2022,  for an average interval of a little below four years between additions:
Max Reger (1948)
Adalbert Stifter (1954)
Joseph von Eichendorff (1957)
Wilhelm Conrad Röntgen (1959)
Max von Pettenkofer (1962)
Jakob Fugger (1967)
Jean Paul (1973)
Richard Strauss (1973)
Carl Maria von Weber (1978)
Gregor Mendel (1983)
Albert Einstein (1990)
Karolina Gerhardinger (1998)
Konrad Adenauer (1999)
Johannes Brahms (2000)
Sophie Scholl (2003)
Carl Friedrich Gauss (2007)
Edith Stein (2009)
Heinrich Heine (2010)
Käthe Kollwitz (2018)
Max Planck (2022)

List of people

Busts 

The original busts are arranged in rows by date of death
At the inauguration in 1842, a total of 96 busts were arranged, in two rows, in chronological order (by year of death), beginning with Henry the Fowler (d. 936) and ending with Goethe (d. 1832).
The upper row comprised 70 busts, beginning with Henry the Fowler and ending with Maria Theresa.
The lower row comprised a total of 26 busts of modern scholars, beginning with Lessing and ending with Goethe.

Upper Row

Busts to the left of the statue of Ludwig I
1. Henry the Fowler – Duke of Saxony and King of the Germans (1809)
2. Otto I, Holy Roman Emperor (Schadow, 1809)
3. Conrad II, Holy Roman Emperor (Schadow, 1809)
6. Frederick I, Holy Roman Emperor (Schwanthaler, 1838)
7. Henry the Lion (d. 1195) – Duke of Saxony and Bavaria  (Schadow, 1811)
8. Frederick II, Holy Roman Emperor (d. 1250) – Stupor mundi (Tieck, 1814)
9. Rudolf I of Habsburg (d. 1291) – German king (Tieck, 1832)
15. Erwin von Steinbach –  architect of the Straßburger Münster (Ohmacht, 1811)
16. Johannes Gutenberg – inventor of movable type (Matthiä, 1835)
17. Jan van Eyck (d. 1441) – Flemish painter (Tieck, 1817–1842)
18. Frederick I, Elector Palatine – the Victorious, Elector of the Palatinate  (Lossow, 1842)
24. Johannes Müller Regiomontanus (d. 1476) –  astronomer and mathematician (Lossow, 1842)
25. Nicholas of Flüe (d. 1487) – Swiss hermit, ascetic and mystic (Tieck, 1812)
26. Eberhard I. of Württemberg – Duke of Württemberg (Wagner, 1830)
27. Hans Memling (d. 1494) – Flemish painter (Woltreck, 1841)
28. Johann von Dalberg  (1455–1503) – Bishop of Worms (second bust by Lossow, added after 1867)
29. Hans von Hallwyl (1433–1504) – Swiss commander at the Battle of Morat (Christen, 1812)
35. Berthold von Henneberg – Elector and Archbishop of Mainz (Mayer, 1824)
36. Maximilian I, Holy Roman Emperor (P. Kaufmann, 1811)
37. Johannes von Reuchlin – German philosopher and humanist (Imhof, 1835)
38. Franz von Sickingen – leader of the knighthood in Rhineland and Swabia (von Bandel, 1827)
39. Ulrich von Hutten – German knight and Renaissance humanist (Kirchmayer, 1811)
40. Albrecht Dürer (1471–1528) –  printmaker and painter  (Rauch, 1837)
41. Georg von Frundsberg – Knight and leader of Landsknechts (Widnmann, 1841)
47. Peter Vischer the Elder – German sculptor  (F. Müller, 1839)
48. Johannes Aventinus (Johann Georg Turmair) – Bavarian scholar and historian (Horchler, 1841)
49. Wolter von Plettenberg – German Master of the Livonian Brothers of the Sword (L. Schwanthaler, 1832)
50. Erasmus of Rotterdam – Dutch humanist (Tieck, 1813)
51. Paracelsus (Theophrast von Hohenheim)  –  Swiss physician and alchemist (E. Wolff, 1827)
52. Nicolaus Copernicus – astronomer  (Schadow, 1807)
58. Hans Holbein the Younger – German painter (Lossow, 1840)
59. Charles V, Holy Roman Emperor (Schwanthaler, 1842)
60. Christoph, Duke of Württemberg  (Bissen, 1831)
61. Aegidius Tschudi – Swiss historian  (Tieck, 1817)
67. William I of Orange – Dutch leader of the Eighty Years' War for the Dutch independence from Spain  (Tieck, 1815)

68. Statue of Ludwig I of Bavaria (1890)

Busts to the right of the statue of Ludwig I
69. August II the Strong – Elector of Saxony and King of Poland (Rietschel, 1840)
70. Julius Echter von Mespelbrunn – Bishop of Würzburg  (Scholl, 1840)
71. Maurice of Orange – Dutch captain-general of the army of the Dutch Republic (Tieck, 1815)
72. Johannes Kepler –  mathematician and astronomer (Schöpf, 1842)
73. Albrecht von Wallenstein –  general in the Thirty Years' War  (Tieck, 1812)
79. Bernhard of Saxe-Weimar – general in the Thirty Years' War (Tieck, 1812/13)
80. Peter Paul Rubens – Flemish painter (Lamine, 1809)
81. Anthony van Dyck – Flemish painter and engraver  (Rauch, 1812)
82. Hugo Grotius – Dutch jurist (Tieck, 1814)
88. Maximilian von und zu Trauttmansdorff – Austrian diplomat that negotiated the Peace of Westphalia (Schaller, 1824)
89. Maximilian I (1573–1651) – Prince-elector of Bavaria (Imhof, 1832)
90. Amalie Elisabeth – Countess of Hesse-Kassel (Tieck, 1817)
91. Maarten Harpertszoon Tromp – Dutch admiral (Kessels, 1825)
92. Paris Graf von Lodron – Archbishop of Salzburg (Eberhard, 1814)
93. Frans Snyders – Flemish painter (Rauch, 1814)
99. Charles X Gustav – King of Sweden (Tieck, 1816)
100. Johann Philipp von Schönborn – Archbishop and Prince-elector of Mainz (Tieck, 1818)
101. Ernst I (1601–1675)  –  the Pious, Duke of Saxe-Gotha and Saxe-Altenburg  (Tieck, 1815)
102. Michiel Adriaenszoon de Ruyter – Dutch admiral (Tieck, 1817)
103. Otto von Guericke – scientist and inventor (Rathgeber, 1811)
104. Frederick William, Elector of Brandenburg – the Great Elector (Wichmann, 1828)
105. Charles V, Duke of Lorraine (Tieck, 1817)
111. William III of Orange – Dutch Stadtholder and king of England, Scotland, and Ireland (Haller, 1816)
112. Ludwig Wilhelm von Baden – Türkenlouis, Imperial commander (Widnmann, 1842)
113. Gottfried Wilhelm Leibniz –  philosopher and mathematician (Schadow, 1808)
114. Herman Boerhaave – Dutch humanist and physician (Leeb, 1823)
115. Maurice of Saxony – German commander and military strategist (Tieck, 1813)
116. Georg Friedrich Händel (1685–1759) –  composer (Schadow, 1815)
122. Nikolaus Ludwig von Zinzendorf  –  religious and social reformer, bishop of the Moravian Church (Tieck, 1818) 
123. Burkhard Christoph von Münnich – German field marshal in Russian service (Lossow, 1841) 
124. Johann Joachim Winckelmann –   archeologist and art writer (R. Schadow, 1814) 
125. William, Count of Schaumburg-Lippe  – Commander of his army in the Seven Years' War and for Portugal (Schadow, 1809) 
127. Albrecht von Haller – Swiss anatomist and physiologist (Schadow, 1808)
128. Raphael Mengs – Bohemian painter (Rauch, 1808) 
129. Maria Theresia (Eberhard, 1811/2)

Lower Row 

Busts to the left of the statue of Ludwig I
4. Gotthold Ephraim Lessing (1729–1781) – poet  (Tieck, 1813)
5. Frederick II of Prussia – Frederick the Great (Schadow, 1807)
10. Christoph Willibald Gluck – composer (Dannecker, 1812)
11. Ernst Gideon Freiherr von Laudon (1716–1790) – Austrian field marshal from Livonia (Kiesling, 1813)
12. Wolfgang Amadeus Mozart –  composer (Schwanthaler, 1846)
13. Karl Wilhelm Ferdinand, Duke of Brunswick-Lüneburg – Prussian Generalfeldmarschall (Schadow, 1808)
14. Justus Möser (1720–1794) – jurist and historian (Schmidt von der Launitz, 1821)
19. Gottfried August Bürger – poet (Tieck, 1817)
20. Catherine II of Russia (1729–1796) – the Great, Tsarina of Russia  (Wredow, 1831)
21. Friedrich Gottlieb Klopstock –  poet (Schadow, 1808)
22. Johann Jakob Wilhelm Heinse – poet and scholar (Haller / Mayer, 1826)
23. Johann Gottfried Herder –  poet and philosopher (Tieck, 1815)
30. Immanuel Kant –   philosopher  (Schadow, 1808)
31. Friedrich von Schiller –  poet (Dannecker, 1794)
32. Joseph Haydn – composer (Robatz, 1810)
33. Johannes von Müller – Swiss historian (Schadow, 1808)
34. Christoph Martin Wieland – poet (Schadow, 1807)
42. Gerhard von Scharnhorst – Prussian general (Rauch, 1830)
43. Michael Andreas Barclay de Tolly – Russian Field Marshal (Widnmann, 1841)
44. Gebhard Leberecht von Blücher – Prussian Generalfeldmarschall  (Rauch, 1817)
45. Karl Philipp Fürst zu Schwarzenberg – Austrian field marshal  (Schaller, 1821)
46. Friedrich Wilhelm Herschel –   astronomer   (Eberhard, 1816)
53. Hans Karl von Diebitsch – Russian field marshal, born in Silesia
54. Karl vom und zum Stein – Prussian politician (1825)
55. August Graf Neidhardt von Gneisenau – Prussian field marshal (1842)
56. Johann Wolfgang von Goethe – poet and polymath (1808)
57. Martin Luther (1848) – Leader of the Reformation, translator of the Bible into German 
62. Archduke Charles, Duke of Teschen (1853)
63. Josef Wenzel Graf Radetzky von Radetz  – Bohemian military leader (1858)
64. Friedrich Schelling  – German philosopher (1860)
65. Ludwig van Beethoven –   composer  (Lossow 1866)
66. Wilhelm I – German Emperor (1898)

68. Statue of Ludwig I of Bavaria (1890)

Busts to the right of the statue of Ludwig I
74. Otto von Bismarck (1908) – Chancellor of North German Confederation and then of the German Empire
75. Helmuth Graf von Moltke (1910) – German Generalfeldmarschall
76. Richard Wagner (1913) – German composer of operas
77. Johann Sebastian Bach (1916) – composer
78. Justus von Liebig – German chemist (1925)
83. Friedrich Ludwig Jahn (1928)
84. Franz Peter Schubert (1925) – Austrian Romantic composer
85. Joseph Görres (1931) 
86. Anton Bruckner (1937) – Austrian composer
87. Max Reger (1948) – German composer and organist of the late romantic period
94. Adalbert Stifter (1954)
95. Joseph Freiherr von Eichendorff (1957)
96. Wilhelm Conrad Röntgen (1959) – German physicist
97. Max von Pettenkofer –  chemist and hygienist  (1962)
98. Jakob Fugger (1967)
106. Jean Paul (1973)
107. Richard Strauss (1973) – German composer
108. Carl Maria von Weber (1978) – German composer
109. Gregor Joh. Mendel (1983) – Silesian Augustinian monk and naturalist
110. Albert Einstein (1990) – physicist
117. Karolina Gerhardinger (1998) – founder of the School Sisters of Notre Dame
118. Konrad Adenauer (1999) – first Chancellor of West Germany
119. Johannes Brahms (2000) – Composer
120.	Carl Friedrich Gauss (2007) – mathematician, astronomer, and physicist
121. Edith Stein (2009) – philosopher and saint
126.	Heinrich Heine (2010) – German Romantic poet
130.	Sophie Scholl (2003) – German passive resistance activist against the Nazi regime.

Plaques 

Plaques were made for people (or acts) of which no portraits or descriptions were available to model sculptures after. The timeline spans from Arminius a.k.a. Hermann der Cherusker (born 17 BC) to watchmaker Peter Henlein, who died in 1542. In 2003 a plaque was added to commemorate the German Resistance against Nazi Germany.

Plaque numbers 1–32 represent the upper row, 33–64 the lower row.
Each plaque includes a short characterization of the individual, with the year of death given in Roman numerals.
The year of death in the table below is that given on the plaque, even where modern historiography suggests a revised date.

The 65th plaque, dedicated to the Widerstand (Resistance) against Nazi Germany, added in 2003, is not part of the two rows of 64 numbered plaques.

See also

 Befreiungshalle (Hall of Liberation, Kelheim, Germany)
 Staatliche Antikensammlungen (Munich, Germany)
 Hermannsdenkmal (Hermann monument, Teutoburg Forest, Germany)
 Ruhmeshalle (Hall of Fame, Munich, Germany)
 Volkshalle, a proposed building

References 

 Walhalla, official guide booklet, translated by Helen Stellner and David Hiley, Bernhard Bosse Verlag Regensburg, 2002
 Eveline G. Bouwers, Public Pantheons in Revolutionary Europe. Comparing Cultures of Remembrance, c. 1790-1840, Basingstoke 2012, pp. 161–212
 Adalbert Müller: Donaustauf and Walhalla (1846) at archive.org
Simone Steger, [https://d-nb.info/1018163743/34 Die Bildnisbüsten der Walhalla bei Donaustauf Von der Konzeption durch Ludwig I. von Bayern zur Ausführung (1807–1842)], dissertation, Ludwig–Maximilian University, Munich (2011).
Ludwig I of Bavaria,  Walhalla's Genossen (1842, 2nd ed. 1847).

External links 

Walhalla official website (2009)

1842 establishments in Germany
Buildings and structures completed in 1842
Buildings and structures in Regensburg (district)
German patriotic songs
Halls of fame in Germany
Landmarks in Germany
Leo von Klenze buildings
Monuments and memorials in Germany
Registered historic buildings and monuments in Bavaria